Dasht-e Soltanabad-e Chahar (also Romanized as Dasht-e Solţānābād-e Chahār) is a village in Kuhestan Rural District, Rostaq District, Darab County, Fars Province, Iran. At the 2006 census, its population was 61, in 13 families.

References 

Populated places in Darab County